Apple Bank for Savings is a savings bank headquartered in Manhasset, New York and operating in the New York metropolitan area.

History
The company was founded in 1863 as the Haarlem Savings Bank by a group of local merchants as a community-based mutual savings bank. Harlem at the time was a suburban village - it was not part of New York City until 1873 - and the bank's first location on 3rd Avenue between 125th and 126th Streets was surrounded by farms and undeveloped lots. In 1869, the bank moved to a building of its own construction on 3rd Avenue and 124th Street.

In 1907, the bank moved its headquarters to 124 E. 125th St.

In 1932, just after the Great Depression, the bank acquired Commonwealth Savings Bank and its 2 branches. The branches were on 157th Street and 180th Street in Washington Heights, Manhattan. In 1933, the bank dropped the second 'a' from its name to match the now-standard spelling of the neighborhood's name: Harlem.

In 1966, the bank opened a branch in Manhasset, New York, on Long Island as the population growth shifted to the suburbs. In 1968, the bank moved its headquarters from Harlem to 42nd Street.

In 1981, in a deal organized by the Federal Deposit Insurance Corporation that included a $160 million grant from the agency, the bank acquired the troubled Central Savings Bank. Created as the German Savings Bank in 1858, Central Savings Bank counted Daniel F. Tiemann, then Mayor of New York, as a charter member and operated out of the Cooper Union building before moving to a location at 14th Street and 4th Avenue in 1864. The acquisition gave the bank an additional seven branches including the Apple Bank Building at 2112 Broadway (between West 73rd and West 74th Streets), a designated historic landmark designed by  York and Sawyer in the Palazzo style of Renaissance Revival architecture, as well as two branches in Nassau County on Long Island.

In the 1970s and early 1980s, the bank continued to expand into the suburbs outside New York City. To reflect its geographic expansion, the bank changed its name to Apple Bank in May 1983.

In 1985, the bank converted from a mutual savings bank to a public company, selling 4.6 million shares for $53.5 million in an initial public offering.

On December 31, 1986, the bank acquired Eastern Savings Bank, obtaining three branches in the Bronx, two in Westchester and two on Long Island.

In 1989, the bank acquired Sag Harbor Savings Bank and its 5 branches for $29.5 million. Sag Harbor Savings Bank was chartered in 1860 in Sag Harbor, New York to provide financial services for the whaling industry.

In 1990, Stanley Stahl, the developer of 277 Park Avenue, acquired the bank for $174 million. The purchase price was well below the book value of the bank and the bank initially rejected the bid and adopted a poison pill to prevent the takeover. Stahl fought the poison pill. Shareholders supported the merger after the stock price fell during the early 1990s recession.

In 1991, William J. Laraia became chairman and chief executive officer of the bank. Laraia reduced the commercial loan portfolio and cut costs significantly.

In 1994, Alan Shamoon became the chief executive officer of the bank.

In August 1999, Stahl died and ownership of the bank passed to trusts.

On April 20, 2013, Apple Bank acquired 29 branches and the related deposit accounts and services from Emigrant Savings Bank. This acquisition gave Apple a total of 77 branches in greater New York and close to $13 billion in assets.

In May 2015, the bank opened a branch in Jackson Heights, Queens.

In June 2015, the bank opened a second branch in Bay Ridge, Brooklyn, at 426 86th Street.

In October 2015, the bank opened a branch in Monsey, New York.

In April 2016, Steven C. Bush became chairman, president, and chief executive officer of the bank.

In February 2021, Apple Bank was fined $12.5 million by the Federal Deposit Insurance Corporation for violations of the Bank Secrecy Act related to anti-money laundering controls.

In May 2022, Apple Bank established an Equipment Finance Group, led by industry veteran Ken Walters and a team of seven. The group was created to diversify Apple Bank's lending base and was part of its growing Commercial and Industrial lending practice. The move aimed to take advantage of the strong performance and protection that secured loans and leases offer across a range of credit conditions, particularly financing "Critical Use" equipment, which served as a solid asset class within C&I lending. Apple Bank's executive team selected Mr. Walters and his team based on their proven track record, vast market knowledge, rock-solid portfolio management skills, and organizational EQ. The new platform at Apple Bank served the equipment financing market well, and it nicely complemented the bank's range of secured lending and conservative portfolio.

In September 2022, the bank expanded its branch network to 84 locations with the opening of a new retail branch in Englewood, NJ, which allows it to better serve New Jersey residents. With both digital products and access to personal service, Apple Bank provides convenient banking options to customers. The bank has remained profitable for 30 consecutive years due to prudent financial and risk management. Steven C. Bush is the Chairman, President, and CEO of Apple Bank, while James Matera is the EVP/Chief Retail Banking Officer. As of December, 2021, Apple Bank had $16.1 billion of assets and $14.0 billion of deposits.

References

External links
 

1863 establishments in New York (state)
Banks based in New York City
Banks established in 1863
Privately held companies of the United States
Privately held companies based in New York (state)